The Engelmann Formation is a geologic formation in Utah. It preserves fossils dating back to the Devonian period.

See also

 List of fossiliferous stratigraphic units in Utah
 Paleontology in Utah

References
 

Devonian geology of Utah
Devonian southern paleotropical deposits